
Tothill is a hamlet in the East Lindsey district of Lincolnshire, England.

Landmarks
The manor of Tothill belonged to Lord Willoughby De Broke.  The manor house is a Grade II listed building.  It was built in the 17th century, with early-18th-century refronting, and some 19th-century alteration.

Toot Hill is the remains of a medieval motte and bailey castle consisting of a large mound with double-ditched outer bailey.  It is a Scheduled Ancient Monument.

The church of Saint Mary was built in the 18th century of brick on a stone base, with a chancel, but no bellcote. It had some 18th-century alterations and was demolished in 1980.

References

External links
"Tothill"; Genuki.org.uk. Retrieved 29 June 2012

Hamlets in Lincolnshire
Houses in Lincolnshire
East Lindsey District